Jurong West is a planning area and residential town located in the West Region of Singapore. Jurong West shares boundaries with Tengah in the north, Jurong East in the east, Boon Lay and Pioneer in the south, and Western Water Catchment in the west.

Originally a forested area, Jurong West is undergoing rapid development under the ambition of the Housing and Development Board (HDB) to transform it into a fully mature housing estate.

History
Jurong West originated from the area once called Peng Kang, named after the gambier plantations along Sungei Jurong. By the mid-20th century, the area was home to several brickworks, palm oil plantations and nurseries. At that time, the only public housing estates in Jurong West were Boon Lay and Taman Jurong. Jurong West was largely left alone until 1984, when the HDB began conceptualisation for a new town in Jurong West. Jurong West was carved into nine subzones that would house a total of 94,000 public and private housing units in the long term.

The town's first apartment blocks (known locally as flats) were completed at Taman Jurong in 1963. By November 2004, about 71,522 dwelling units were completed. As of 31 March 2018, there are 74,301 HDB dwelling units in Jurong West.

Geography

Jurong West is a primarily residential town situated west of Tengah New Town in the western part of Singapore, under the West Region as defined by the Urban Redevelopment Authority (URA).

The town is bordered to the north by the Pan Island Expressway (PIE), to the east by Sungei Jurong (Jurong River) and Jurong Lake, to the south by the Ayer Rajah Expressway (AYE), and to the west by Benoi Road and Upper Jurong Road. Jurong West Town Centre is located in Jurong West Central. An industrial area, part of the Jurong Industrial Estate, is located south of Boon Lay Way and Upper Jurong Road. Another industrial area is currently under development in Wenya as part of the Jurong Innovation District.

Subzones
Jurong West New Town is divided into the following nine subzones.
 Boon Lay
 Chin Bee
 Hong Kah
 Jurong West Central
 Kian Teck
 Safti
 Taman Jurong
 Wenya
 Yunnan

Demographics
As of 2018, Jurong West has a population of 266,720, most of whom are part of the working population. The most populous subzone is Yunnan with 68,840 residents, closely followed by Jurong West Central with 65,720 residents. Chin Bee, however, has just ten residents, while Safti is completely unpopulated.

Notable places

Jurong West's two main rivers, Sungei Jurong and Sungei Lanchar, run through the town with a network of green connectors along their banks. They link housing precincts to neighborhood parks such as Jurong Central Park, as well as the Jurong West Sports Centre, Jurong West Stadium and Frontier Community Centre. These park connectors are linked to the Chinese Garden in Jurong East New Town and the Bukit Batok Town Park in the north, to better serve the recreational needs of the residents of Jurong West. Jurong Central Park, located in Kian Teck, is a rectangular green space created behind Boon Lay MRT station.

Jurong West's major public transport amenities were built in tandem with the main public housing development. The elevated track infrastructure of the East West MRT line was developed as the existing public housing blocks were being built in the 1980s. The amenities were built in a contiguous building complex, which gives commuters direct access between Boon Lay MRT station, Boon Lay Bus Interchange, The Centris condominium and Jurong Point shopping centre.

Transportation
City planners plan for public transport to eventually become the preferred mode of transport. The government of Singapore uses public transport to reduce pollution caused by heavy road traffic. Jurong West is part of the Urban Redevelopment Authority's focus for realising this urban planning model. As Jurong West is relatively distant from the city centre at the Central Area, an efficient, high-volume and high-speed public transport system is also preferred to using road networks, as the government is aiming to reduce the number of cars on the road.

Public transport

East West line

Jurong West Town is linked to the rest of Singapore through the East West Line (EWL) at Boon Lay MRT Station, located at the Town Centre. The EWL is a heavy rail mass rapid transit system, and connects to other systems in the MRT network. It is operated by SMRT.

There are three Mass Rapid Transit (MRT) stations that serve Jurong West Planning Area, which are Lakeside, Boon Lay and Pioneer.

Boon Lay MRT station

The Boon Lay MRT Station is located next to Boon Lay Bus Interchange for commuters' ease of switching across different modes of public transport. The MRT station began operations on 6 July 1990, as the western terminus of the East West Line, before additional stations were added further west of the line at Pioneer and Joo Koon on 28 February 2009.

Lakeside MRT station

Lakeside (EW26), another station along the EWL in Jurong West Town, serves the housing developments in Taman Jurong, Hong Kah and Boon Lay. The station began operations on 5 November 1988.

Pioneer MRT station

Pioneer (EW28) is the newest EWL station to open in Jurong West, on 28 February 2009. The station improves accessibility to residential areas of Nanyang and Pioneer, as well as the industrial areas located south of the station.

Jurong Region line

The inter-town Jurong Region Line (JRL) system is a 24 km mass rapid transit line that will connect residents to the town centre, as well as other areas such as Tengah, Choa Chu Kang and Jurong East. The MRT line will have 24 stations and all will be elevated. The line will open in 2026.

Boon Lay Bus Interchange

The Boon Lay Bus Interchange was originally opened in July 1990 along with Boon Lay MRT station. At that time, developments around the area in Jurong West New Town were still actively in progress. It was later rebuilt and reopened in December 2009 at the ground level of Jurong Point Shopping Centre, next to Centris condominium, and is the fourth air-conditioned bus interchange in Singapore, after Toa Payoh Bus Interchange, Sengkang Bus Interchange and Ang Mo Kio Bus Interchange.

Road network
Jurong West is connected to many parts of Singapore through its road network. The Pan Island Expressway (PIE) and Ayer Rajah Expressway (AYE) link Jurong West Town up with Singapore's expressway network.

Major roads that run within the boundaries of Jurong West Planning Area include Corporation Road, Boon Lay Way, Jalan Boon Lay, Jalan Bahar, Upper Jurong Road, Pioneer Road North, Jurong West Avenue 4 and Jurong West Avenue 2.

Jurong West Town Centre
There are four major building complexes within the Jurong West Town Centre.

Jurong Point Shopping Centre
Jurong Point Shopping Centre is Singapore's largest suburban shopping centre. The shopping centre started operations in December 1995 and expanded twice in 1999 and 2008.

The Centris
The Centris is a private condominium that is located above Jurong Point Shopping Centre.

Jurong West Community Building
The Jurong West Community Building is an integrated development comprising the Jurong West Public Library, The Frontier Community Club and Jurong Medical Centre. It is located behind Jurong Point Shopping Centre.

Boon Lay Interchange
Boon Lay Interchange, located in the centre of the town, consists of the Boon Lay Bus Interchange and Boon Lay MRT Station.

Amenities

Education
There are 12 primary schools, 11 secondary schools and 2 international schools in Jurong West New Town.

Fire stations
Jurong Fire Station, which opened on 17 November 2017, is the first fire station in Singapore to have a slide. The fire station covers 4,000 square metres, and is used by the Singapore Civil Defence Force.

Medical facilities

Pioneer Polyclinic is a government healthcare institution serving the local community in Jurong West. The polyclinic was opened in January 2018. Also located in Jurong West is the Jurong Medical Centre, which complements the acute and step-down care services of Ng Teng Fong General Hospital and Jurong Community Hospital.

Sports facilities
Jurong West Sports Centre, formerly known as Jurong West Sports and Recreation Centre, is the largest sports centre in Singapore, and offers one of the two sheltered pools managed by Sport Singapore.

Politics
Currently, Jurong West is represented in the Parliament of Singapore by seven members of parliament (MPs): three MPs from Jurong GRC, one MP from Pioneer SMC, and three MPs from West Coast GRC, with effect from the 2020 General Election.

References

External links

Chua Chu Kang Town Council
Jurong-Clementi Town Council
West Coast Town Council
South West Community Development Council

 
New towns in Singapore
West Region, Singapore
Places in Singapore
New towns started in the 1960s